Bistreț is a commune in Dolj County, Oltenia, Romania with a population of 4,616 people in 2002. It is composed of four villages: Bistreț, Bistrețu Nou, Brândușa and Plosca.

Natives
 Ilie Balaci

References

Communes in Dolj County
Localities in Oltenia
Important Bird Areas of Romania